Andries Petrus Treurnicht (19 February 1921 – 22 April 1993) was a South African politician, Minister of Education during the Soweto Riots and for a short time leader of the National Party in Transvaal. In 1982 he founded and led the Conservative Party of South Africa whose successes among the white electorate made him Leader of the Opposition in 1987, a position he retained until his death.

Early life
Treurnicht was born in Piketberg, Cape Province, and began his working life as a journalist, being editor of Die Kerkbode and Hoofstad. He was a keen sportsman, excelling on the rugby field, playing provincial rugby against the All Blacks in 1949. After obtaining his MA in Theology at the University of Stellenbosch, he completed a Doctorate in Political Philosophy at the University of Cape Town. He subsequently entered the Dutch Reformed Church (NG Kerk), serving various congregations as minister for fourteen years. He was elected Deputy Chairman of the Cape Synod and later of the General Synod. He combined Afrikaner nationalism with neo-Calvinism and strongly supported the continuation of apartheid.

National Party career
Entering politics in 1970, as a member of the National Party, in 1971 Treurnicht was elected as a Member of Parliament for Waterberg. Appointed as Deputy Minister of Education in 1976, his instruction to implement the policy that black students should be taught half in English, half in Afrikaans triggered the Soweto Riots. In 1978, he was chosen, over the heads of 12 ministers, as Leader of the National Party in the Transvaal, and, in 1979, he became Minister of State for Administration and of Statistics. He was chairman of the Afrikaner Broederbond (AB) from 1972 -1974. He had to leave the AB in 1983, as the newly formed Conservative Party members were not welcome in it.

Conservative Party career
On 20 March 1982, he and 22 other MPs quit the National Party to form the Conservative Party to oppose P.W. Botha and the National Party's limited reforms to apartheid. The CP's English language programme booklets from 1987 to 1989 stated that the party was established "to continue the policy of self-determination after the [NP] government had exchanged self-determination" (something the CP described as an "infallible policy"), for power-sharing.

In 1987, the Conservative Party became the official opposition in the House of Assembly, winning 550,000 votes, displacing the liberal Progressive Federal Party. Donald Simpson, writing in the South African newspaper, The Star, went as far as to predict that the National Party would lose the next election and that the Conservative Party would become the new government of South Africa.

In June 1989, accompanied by Clive Derby-Lewis, Carl Werth, and several other Conservative Party officials, Treurnicht made an official visit to London and some other European capitals.  The far-right Western Goals Institute organized his London visit, and the Conservative Monday Club held a dinner in his honour, at which at least one British Conservative Party MP, Tim Janman, was present.

Already nicknamed "Doctor No", in 1992, he led the opposition campaign during the referendum called by F.W. de Klerk to gain white approval for negotiations to end apartheid. This campaign marked the peak of Conservative support in South Africa, gaining just under one million votes, but the "No" vote was defeated 2 to 1 by white voters.

Treurnicht was the author of no fewer than sixteen books, many in the cultural field.

He died on 22 April 1993, in Cape Town, during a heart operation. His death came shortly after the Conservative Party suffered a major blow with the arrest of senior member Clive Derby-Lewis for his role in the assassination of Chris Hani. His former deputy minister, Ferdinand Hartzenberg, became the last leader of the Conservative Party.

Private life
Treurnicht married Engela Dreyer on 18 January 1949, and they had four daughters.

References

External links
1991 interview with the Los Angeles Times

1921 births
1993 deaths
People from Bergrivier Local Municipality
Afrikaner people
South African people of Dutch descent
Members of the Dutch Reformed Church in South Africa (NGK)
National Party (South Africa) politicians
Conservative Party (South Africa) politicians
Members of the House of Assembly (South Africa)
Stellenbosch University alumni
University of Cape Town alumni